Sinanüddin Fakih Yusuf Pasha was an Ottoman statesman. He was fourth grand vizier of the Ottoman Empire from 1349 to 1364. He served as the last grand vizier of Sultan Orhan and the first grand vizier of Sultan Murad I.

A 1360 inscription by sultan Orhan mentions Sinanüddin Fakih Yusuf and notes that he was the son of a man named Muslihuddin Musa and the grandson of a man named Mecdüddin İsa. It is also understood from this inscription that he was an Ahi who served as Ottoman bureaucrats.

After his death (and the end of his term), the former kazasker Çandarlı Halil Pasha the Elder became grand vizier, beginning the "Çandarlı era" of the Ottoman Empire, where the prominent Çandarlı family supplied several generations of grand viziers and held great political power.

See also 
 List of Ottoman Grand Viziers

References 

14th-century Grand Viziers of the Ottoman Empire
Turks from the Ottoman Empire
1364 deaths
Year of birth unknown